Gulzar Ahmed (born 2 February 1957) is a Pakistani jurist who served as the 27th Chief Justice of Pakistan from 21 December 2019 to 1 February 2022.

Early life and education
Ahmed's father, Noor Muhammad, was a lawyer in Karachi. Ahmed completed his elementary education from Gulistan School located in Karachi. He obtained his Bachelor of Arts degree from Government National College, Karachi. He went on to obtain the law degree from Sindh Muslim Law College.

Judicial career
Ahmed started his legal career as an advocate on 18 January 1986 and joined Sindh High Court Bar Association (SHCBA) on 4 April 1988. He joined Supreme Court Bar Association on 15 September 2001. He was elected honorary secretary of SHCBA from 1999-2000. From there on, he became a justice of Sindh High Court and then was appointed as a justice in the Supreme Court of Pakistan on 16 November 2011. Ahmed was part of the five-judge bench which disqualified the-then Prime Minister Nawaz Sharif in the Panama Papers case,  penning a dissenting opinion in the split verdict.

On 4 December 2019, the law ministry notified the appointment of Ahmed Chief Justice of Pakistan (CJP) upon approval by President Arif Alvi. On 21 December 2019, Ahmed took oath as the CJP following the retirement of Asif Saeed Khosa.

On Feb 11, a five-judge bench of the Supreme Court headed by Chief Justice Gulzar Ahmed had issued an order banning Justice Isa from hearing cases involving Prime Minister Imran Khan, stating that justice Qazi Faez Isa had already filed a petition against the prime minister in his personal capacity against the proposed plan to distribute Rs500 million development fund each among PTI lawmakers. A senior member of the Pakistan Bar Council (PBC) Munir Kakar and vice chairman of the Balochistan Bar Council (BBC) Qasim Ali Gajaizi and the chairman of the executive committee (BBC) in a statement regretted that such a directive was against legal and constitutional principles, especially when a 10-judge Supreme Court bench had already quashed the presidential reference filed against Justice Isa — a reference which they said was based on malice.

In June 2021, he ordered demolition of properties across Karachi.

References

1957 births
Living people
Justices of the Supreme Court of Pakistan
21st-century Pakistani judges
Sindh Muslim Law College alumni
Chief justices of Pakistan
People from Karachi
Muhajir people